Pseudactinia is a genus of sea anemones in the family Actiniidae.

Species
Species in the genus include:

 Pseudactinia flagellifera (Drayton in Dana, 1846)
 Pseudactinia infecunda (McMurrich, 1893)
 Pseudactinia plettenbergensis Carlgren, 1928
 Pseudactinia varia Carlgren, 1938

References

Actiniidae
Hexacorallia genera